The Longest Most Meaningless Movie in the World is an underground movie made in the UK that runs to 48 hours long. It was directed by Vincent Patouillard, and produced by Anthony Scott.

No actual footage was shot for the project, which instead consists entirely of outtakes, commercials, strips of undeveloped film, Academy leader, and other filmic cast-off material, creating a seemingly endless stream of news-reel and stock footage. It was released in 1968.

It was the longest film ever made at the time of its release, but has since been superseded by other films.

See also 
List of longest films by running time

References

External links 

1968 films
1968 independent films
British avant-garde and experimental films
British independent films
Compilation films
British anthology films
1960s English-language films
1960s British films